The Pachitea River is a river in Peru. It is a tributary of the Ucayali River.

References

Rivers of Peru
Tributaries of the Ucayali River